Edward William J. Savage (born 15 November 1989) is an English footballer and former child actor.

Early life
Edward William J. Savage was born in 1989 in High Wycombe, Buckinghamshire.

Career
Savage played Steven Beale in the BBC soap opera EastEnders, taking over the role from Stuart Stevens. Savage left EastEnders when his character was written out in 2002.

Savage ended his acting career, opting for football. He played football for Wycombe Wanderers alongside his older brother Andrew, and attended John Hampden Grammar School. He also enjoys judo. He picked up the Alan Henry Gillot Award for the Best Youth Team Player, presented by Ian Culverhouse. His senior career was cut short after two seasons, following eight unsuccessful operations on a dislocated kneecap.

References

External links

1989 births
English male soap opera actors
Living people
Actors from Buckinghamshire
Footballers from Buckinghamshire
Sportspeople from High Wycombe
English male child actors
English footballers
Association football midfielders
Wycombe Wanderers F.C. players
People educated at John Hampden Grammar School